Jon R. Moeller (born 1964) is an American businessman. He was elected Chief Executive Officer of Procter & Gamble on July 29, 2021, to succeed David S. Taylor on November 1, 2021.

Biography

Early life
Jon Moeller was born in Chicago, Illinois on June 11, 1964. He graduated with a Bachelor of Science in biology from the Cornell University College of Agriculture and Life Sciences at Cornell University in 1986, and received an M.B.A. from the same university in 1988.

Career
He joined Procter & Gamble on September 1, 1988  and was appointed Vice President in 2007. He also served as treasurer from 2007 to December 2008. On January 1, 2009, he became Chief Financial Officer. He is also a visiting lecturer at the Samuel Curtis Johnson Graduate School of Management at his alma mater, Cornell University.

He sits on the board of directors of Monsanto since August 3, 2011. He serves on the Council for Division Finance Leaders of The Conference Board, and he is a member of the Cincinnati Business Advisory Council of the Federal Reserve Bank of Cleveland as well as the executive committee of the Cincinnati Commercial Club.

He sits on the board of trustees of the Cincinnati Art Museum.

Personal life
He is married to Lisa Sauer, a Cornell graduate who encouraged him to apply to Procter & Gamble after she had interned there.

References

American chief financial officers
1964 births
Living people
Procter & Gamble people
Businesspeople from Cincinnati
People from Covington, Kentucky
Cornell University College of Agriculture and Life Sciences alumni
Cornell University faculty
Samuel Curtis Johnson Graduate School of Management alumni